Otopleura nitida is a species of sea snail, a marine gastropod mollusk in the family Pyramidellidae, the pyrams and their allies.

Description

The oval shell is shining, white, sometimes marbled with pale chestnut. The sculpture is longitudinally flatly ribbed. The interstices are pitted. The length varies between 7.5 mm and 13 mm.

Distribution
This marine species occurs off La Réunion, the Philippines, French Polynesia, Japan and in the South China Sea.

References

 Chen Zhiyun, Zhang Supin (2011), Two new records of Pyramidellidae (Gastropoda, Heterobranchia) from China Seas; Chinese Journal of Oceanology and Limnology vol. 29 # 6 p. 1302-1305
 Higo, S., Callomon, P. & Goto, Y. (1999). Catalogue and bibliography of the marine shell-bearing Mollusca of Japan. Osaka. : Elle Scientific Publications. 749 pp. 
  Jean Tröndlé and Michel Boutet, Inventory of Marine Molluscs of French Polynesia, ATOLL RESEARCH BULLETIN #570, 2008

External links
 To World Register of Marine Species
 

Pyramidellidae
Gastropods described in 1855